Union-North United School Corporation comprises Union Township, including the town of Lakeville in St. Joseph County, Indiana, and North Township, including the town of La Paz in Marshall County, Indiana. The school corporation was organized July 1, 1962, and is governed by a five-member elected Board of School Trustees. LaVille Elementary School houses Grades K-6 and LaVille Jr.-Sr. High School comprises Grades 7–12. The school community is located approximately fifteen miles south of South Bend, Indiana, and approximately eight miles north of Plymouth, Indiana.

External links
Union-North United School Corporation

School districts in Indiana
School districts established in 1962
Education in St. Joseph County, Indiana
Education in Marshall County, Indiana
1962 establishments in Indiana